Broadway Melody of 1936 is a musical film released by Metro-Goldwyn-Mayer in 1935. In New York, the film opened at the Capitol Theatre, the site of many prestigious MGM premieres. It was a follow-up of sorts to the successful The Broadway Melody, which had been released in 1929, although, there is no story connection with the earlier film beyond the title and some music.

The film was written by Harry W. Conn, Moss Hart, Jack McGowan and Sid Silvers. It was directed by Roy Del Ruth and starred Jack Benny, Eleanor Powell, Robert Taylor, June Knight, Frances Langford, Sid Silvers, Buddy Ebsen and Vilma Ebsen (in their film debut). It was nominated for the Academy Award for Best Picture.

Plot
Irene Foster (Eleanor Powell) tries to convince her high school sweetheart, Broadway producer Robert Gordon (Robert Taylor), to give her a chance to star in his new musical, but he is too busy with the rich widow (June Knight) backing his show. Irene tries to show Gordon that she has the talent to succeed, but he will not hire her. Things become complicated when she begins impersonating a French dancer, who was actually the invention of a gossip columnist (Jack Benny, parodying Walter Winchell).

Cast
 Jack Benny as Bert Keeler
 Eleanor Powell as Irene Foster
 Robert Taylor as Robert Gordon
 Una Merkel as Kitty Corbett
 Sid Silvers as Snoop Blue
 Buddy Ebsen as Ted Burke
 June Knight as Lillian Brent
 Vilma Ebsen as Sally Burke
 Nick Long, Jr. as Basil Newcombe
 Robert John Wildhack as Hornblow (credited as Robert Wildhack)
 Paul Harvey as Scully
 Frances Langford as herself
 Harry Stockwell as himself

Cast notes
This was Powell's first leading role, and her first film for MGM. She would appear in the next two entries in the Broadway Melody series: Broadway Melody of 1938 and Broadway Melody of 1940. (These films were not related to each other in terms of storyline.) This also marked Ebsen's film debut.  Though she was dubbed in this film by Marjorie Lane, Eleanor recorded "You Are My Lucky Star" with Tommy Dorsey and His Orchestra (Victor 25158).

Don Wilson, Jack Benny's regular announcer on The Jack Benny Program, is not credited in Broadway Melody of 1936, but his presence in the movie is evident at the beginning where he is the radio show host.

Soundtrack
 "Broadway Rhythm" (1935)
 Music by Nacio Herb Brown
 Lyrics by Arthur Freed
 Performed by Frances Langford
 Performed by Buddy Ebsen, Vilma Ebsen, June Knight, Nick Long Jr., and Eleanor Powell
 "You Are My Lucky Star" (1935)
 Music by Nacio Herb Brown
 Lyrics by Arthur Freed; Played during the opening credits
 Performed by Frances Langford and chorus
 Performed by Eleanor Powell (dubbed by Marjorie Lane) and chorus
 Performed by Roger Edens and Eleanor Powell
 Performed by Robert Taylor and chorus
 "Broadway Melody" (1929)
 Music by Nacio Herb Brown
 Lyrics by Arthur Freed
 Performed by Harry Stockwell
 "I've Got a Feelin' You're Foolin'" (1935)
 Music by Nacio Herb Brown
 Lyrics by Arthur Freed
 Sung by June Knight, Robert Taylor and chorus
 Performed by June Knight, Nick Long Jr., and chorus
 Performed by Frances Langford
 "Sing Before Breakfast" (1935)
 Music by Nacio Herb Brown
 Lyrics by Arthur Freed
 Performed by Buddy Ebsen, Vilma Ebsen, and Eleanor Powell (dubbed by Marjorie Lane)
 "All I Do Is Dream Of You" (French version) (1934)
 Music by Nacio Herb Brown
 Lyrics by Arthur Freed
 "On a Sunday Afternoon" (1935)
 Music by Nacio Herb Brown
 Lyrics by Arthur Freed
 Performed by Buddy Ebsen and Vilma Ebsen
 "The Old Folks at Home (Swanee River)" (1851)
 Written by Stephen Foster
 Performed by Roger Edens

Accolades
The film was nominated for three Oscars at the 8th Academy Awards: Best Picture, Best Writing (Original Story), and Best Dance Direction, winning the last one. As this film is the second in a film series (though not a direct continuation), it could be viewed as the first "sequel" to ever be nominated for Best Picture.

The film is recognized by American Film Institute in these lists:

 2004: AFI's 100 Years...100 Songs:	
 "You Are My Lucky Star" – Nominated

Box office
According to MGM records, the film earned $1,655,000 in the US and Canada and $1,216,000 elsewhere resulting in a profit of $691,000.

References

Green, Stanley (1999) Hollywood Musicals Year by Year (2nd ed.), pub. Hal Leonard Corporation  page 48

External links
 
 
 
 
 

1935 films
1935 musical films
Metro-Goldwyn-Mayer films
1930s English-language films
Films about musical theatre
American black-and-white films
Films directed by Roy Del Ruth
American musical films
1930s American films